Lac-Poulin is a village in the Beauce-Sartigan Regional County Municipality in the Chaudière-Appalaches region of Quebec, Canada. Its population was 171 as of 2021. Lac-Poulin is an enclave of Saint-Benoît-Labre.

Lac-Poulin is named after the lake it surrounds (Poulin), which was named after the first settler Claude Poulin. The first settlers QUEBEC included Claude Poulin (1614-1687) a carpenter, born in St Maclou, Rouen, Normandie, France and his wife Jeanne Mercier (1621-1687)born in Luçon, Eure-et-Loir, Centre, France. Poulin itself is a common last name in the region. The village is mainly a summer vacation site.

History 
Lac-Poulin was created in 1959 when it splitted away from Saint-Benoit-Labre.

Demographics 

References

Commission de toponymie du Québec
Ministère des Affaires municipales, des Régions et de l'Occupation du territoire

Annual Report of the Geographic Board of Canada, Volumes 1-10
9-10 Edward VII., A.1910 Page 186
By Geographic Board of Canada

Incorporated places in Chaudière-Appalaches
Villages in Quebec